Olga Sáez Larra (born 18 September 1994) is a Spanish former tennis player.

Sáez Larra has career-high WTA rankings of 231 in singles and 356 in doubles. In her career, she won 11 singles and 14 doubles titles at tournaments of the ITF Women's Circuit.

Sáez Larra represented Spain for the first time in Fed Cup competition in 2017, when she lost her sole match.

ITF Circuit finals

Singles: 23 (11 titles, 12 runner–ups)

Doubles: 20 (14 titles, 6 runner–ups)

Fed Cup participation

Doubles (0–1)

External links
 
 
 

1994 births
Living people
Spanish female tennis players
Tennis players from Madrid